Royal Air Force Gütersloh, more commonly known as RAF Gütersloh, was a Royal Air Force Germany military airfield, the nearest Royal Air Force airfield to the East/West German border, in the vicinity of the town of Gütersloh.  It was constructed by the Germans prior to the Second World War.  The station was captured by the Americans in April 1945 and was handed over to the RAF in June 1945 as Headquarters No. 2 Group RAF.

History
Its early history is largely undetermined.  It is known that construction began in 1935 for a paratroop unit using Junkers Ju 52s then as a radar school, and the station was active in 1944–45 with Junkers Ju 88 Nightfighters of 5./NJG 2 (Nachtjagdgeschwader 2) as part of the Defense of the Reich defensive aerial campaign fought by the Luftwaffe.

The tower of the Officers' Mess contains a room known as Göring's Room. Legend has it that Hermann Göring used this room to relive his wartime exploits with the new generation of flyers. Reportedly a favourite expression of his was "If I should lie, may the beam above my head crack". In response to this a junior officer arranged that the beam be sawn through and, by a system of pulleys, that the beam should appear to crack in response to the Reichmarschall's challenge. An article appearing in Flight magazine in 1946 has the same story with "an elderly station commander" featuring in the Göring role. From interviews with Luftwaffe personnel of the period, it appears that Göring visited the station before and during the war. A photograph of the Reichmarschall supposedly at Gütersloh is displayed in the Officers' Mess.

The station was captured by the Americans in April 1945 and designated as "Advanced Landing Ground Y-99".  The Americans laid down a 4,000-foot SMT hardened runway and the Ninth Air Force operated Lockheed P-38 Lightning and North American P-51 Mustang reconnaissance aircraft of the 363d Tactical Reconnaissance Group in late April.  Also the P-38 Lightning-equipped 370th Fighter Group operated from Gütersloh until the German capitulation on 8 May 1945. The 370th remained until the airfield was turned over to the RAF as part of the formation of the British occupation zone in Germany on 27 June 1945.

RAF Control
The RAF established Headquarters No. 2 Group RAF after the Americans moved south.  From 1958 RAF Gütersloh fell under the operational command of 2 ATAF, like all other RAFG stations.  The RAF initially built a 1,830 metres/meter long runway in 1946, which was later lengthened to 2,252 metres/meters

During its history as an RAF station, it was home to two squadrons of the English Electric Lightning F2/F2A – No. 92 Squadron RAF and No. 19 Squadron RAF from 1968 to 1976. These provided two aircraft for the Quick Response Alert, able to scramble within minutes.  It then became home to No. 3 Squadron RAF and No. 4 Squadron RAF which flew successive variants of the British Aerospace Harrier II.  After the Harriers departed, the RAF continued to operate helicopters, No. 18 Squadron RAF with the Boeing Chinook and No. 230 Squadron RAF with the Westland Puma HC1. The base was also used by No. 63 Squadron RAF Regiment with Rapier and HQ No. 33 Wing RAF Regiment.

RAF Gütersloh closed and was transferred to the British Army on 30 June 1993.

RAF units and aircraft

Gütersloh under the British Army
Following the withdrawal by the Royal Air Force in 1993, the base became a British Army Garrison, called the Princess Royal Barracks, Gütersloh, a base for British Army helicopters and Royal Logistic Corps Regiments.

 HQ Gütersloh Garrison
 HQ 102 Logistic Brigade
 1 Regiment, AAC
 652 Squadron, AAC
 661 Squadron, AAC
 1 Logistic Support Regiment, Royal Logistic Corps
 74 HQ Squadron
 2 Close Support Squadron
 12 Close Support Squadron
 23 General Support Squadron,
 2 Logistic Support Regiment, Royal Logistic Corps
 27 HQ Squadron
 22 Close Support Squadron
 45 Close Support Squadron
 76 General Support Squadron
 6 Regiment, Royal Logistic Corps
 600 HQ Squadron
 62 Material Squadron
 61 Ammo Squadron
LAD REME 
 8 Regiment, Royal Logistic Corps
 64 Fuel Squadron
30 Squadron (part of 24 Regiment, Royal Logistic Corps)
 5 Regiment, Royal Military Police
 114 Provost Company (now a Det. of 110 Provost Company, 1 RMP)
 262 Brigade Signal and HQ Squadron, Royal Signals
In September 2016 the final Soldiers left Princess Royal Barracks for the last time.

See also

Advanced Landing Ground
List of aircraft of the Royal Air Force
List of former Royal Air Force stations
List of Royal Air Force aircraft squadrons

References

Citations

Bibliography

External links

Spotting Group Royal Air Force Gütersloh
aerial photo of RAF Gütersloh
Article on Gütersloh Hunters  tersloh]
Gutersloh – From ARRSEpedia, The British Military Open Encyclopedia

Military installations established in 1945
Royal Air Force stations in Germany
Barracks in Germany
Buildings and structures in Gütersloh (district)
Military installations closed in 1993
Airfields of the United States Army Air Forces in Germany
Gütersloh
Airports established in 1935
Airports in North Rhine-Westphalia
Gütersloh